Wendy Hancil Bangura is a Sierra Leonean actress, film producer, author and entrepreneur.

Career

Acting
She was the producer of the 2012 film, The Entrapped, in which she was also a cast alongsides Nollywood's Desmond Elliot who directed the film and others such as Syr Law, Illya Konstantin, Susan Peters and Emmanuel Mensah. For this film, she was nominated in the "Best Film Producer – Diaspora" category in the 2012 Golden Icons Academy Movie Awards.

She was featured in the 2014 Cameroonian film, The Greedy Realtor, directed by El Vis (VIS 3K) and produced by Benedette Keyi Jeff. Other cast include: Blaise Christian Sitchet, Clara Fernaldo, Ralph Maunello and others.

Writing
She is the author of the 97 paged book, Tears, Trials, and Triumphs.

Filmography

Accolades

References

External links
 Wendy Bangura on IMDb
 Wendy Bangura on Backstage

Sierra Leonean actresses
Sierra Leonean writers
Year of birth missing (living people)
Living people